The Stone Council is a 2006 French thriller film. Based on a novel by  Jean-Christophe Grangé the film depicts an inter-continental, mystical conspiracy unfolding following the adoption of a boy from Mongolia.

Plot 

Bellucci plays Diane Siprien, a translator, who adopts a Mongolian child name Liu-San with the help of her friend Sybille. Years later, a bruise appears on the boy's chest, and the two women suffer nightmares. Diane is dispatched on assignment, and Liu goes comatose while in Sybille's temporary care. He begins speaking in an unknown tongue. As Diane tries to place the language, mysterious murders began occurring in her orbit. She discovers the boy comes from an ancient, mystic Mongolian tribe — the Tseven — who want the boy returned to them for a religious prophecy involving the Council of the Stone.

Reception
Variety called the film a "French Sixth Sense", and a "generously budgeted piece of esoterica" that "won't be enough to scare up an audience, unless it's a very young one that hasn't heard all these cliches before." Screen Daily similarly found an American parallel, the Da Vinci Code, and called the film "overwrought".

References

External links
 

2006 films
Films set in Mongolia
French thriller films
2000s French films